Roche Bobois is a French company that designs and retails furniture and home accessories.

History 

In 1960, having become acquainted at the Copenhagen Furniture Fair, Philippe and François Roche joined forces with Jean-Claude and Patrick Chouchan to import Scandinavian furniture to Paris. Soon after, they added Scandinavian giftware, such as textiles, tableware and tapestries to their furniture ranges. Known as ‘complementary objects’, these accessories were sold in adjoining boutiques.

1961: The first joint national advertising campaign was launched in Elle magazine. Two campaigns a year have been created every year since, over a period of nearly 50 years. Creation of the first joint catalogue and development of a joint national network of franchises based on retail alone with no ownership of manufacturing resources, a revolutionary business model at the time.

1965: Opening of the first showroom outside France, in Belgium.

In 1970, Philippe Roche and colleagues meet designer Hans Hopfer while on a trip to Germany. The latter's design for a sofa that allows you to ‘live at ground level’, initially named ‘Lounge’, has, under its newer name ‘Mah Jong’, been Roche Bobois's best-selling sofa design since 1990. Roche Bobois Mah Jong

1973: Opening of the first showroom in Canada.

1974: Opening of the first Roche Bobois showroom in the US. and in Spain.

1980s: The Roche Bobois offering is extended with the development of the Provinciales collection, aimed at new owners of country homes.

1990s: Development of the Voyages collection, created in response to the demand for ethnic style furniture.

1995: Opening of the first showroom in Italy.

Beginning of the 21st century – two developments for Roche Bobois:
Increased international development of a network of showrooms
Development of partnerships with designers and architects, who began to design pieces specifically for Roche Bobois

2004: The first showroom in China is opened. The 100th showroom abroad is opened.

2009: A series of theme-based Design Competitions aimed at supporting emerging talent is launched. The first competition, organised in China, results in the design and manufacture of the gas-injection moulded Ava: created by a Chinese designer and fabricated by an Italian manufacturer. Subsequently, competitions have taken place in Morocco and most recently the UK (winner to be announced shortly).

In December 2011, Philippe Roche, co-founder of the Roche Bobois brand, died, aged 77.

Since 2011, Roche Bobois has launched a new collection every six months. The brand has 250 showrooms, 80 of which are corporate-owned, located in 45 countries.

2012 is the year of international growth: for the first time in its history, Roche Bobois reports more than 50% of turnover achieved abroad, notably in North America. Having been present in this region since 1974, the North America network becomes the second largest with the New York Madison store becoming the most important in the world in terms of sales.

In 2013, Roche Bobois further reinforces its international presence with a scheduled programme of 15 new showroom openings in more than 10 countries, including Singapore, Colombia, Indonesia and Bulgaria.

In 2015, Roche Bobois confirmed its presence in the world of art and culture as a patron of the Pavillon France of the Universal Exhibition in Milan.
In 2015, opening of the first showroom in South Africa. Showroom based in Cape Town (Gardens) in a vibrant district and then in 2018, opening of a second showroom in Sandton (luxury neighborhood of Johannesburg).

The following year, in 2016, Roche Bobois developed a new collection with architect Jean Nouvel. The brand also experienced strong growth with 10 new showroom openings, 8 of which were international, including in Guatemala and India.

In 2017, the brand's first showroom in Japan opened in Tokyo, adding to a network of more than 250 showrooms in 55 countries.

The same year, Roche Bobois celebrated the tenth anniversary of the Legend bookcase, designed by Christophe Delcourt, which was the first entirely eco-designed collection for the French brand.

Designers 

Roche Bobois works in collaboration with a number of designers and architects to create its collections.

In the 1980s, Hans Hopfer and Italian architect Luigi Gorgoni worked with the brand.

Again, in the 2000s, collaborations include:
The Métropolis Collection created by Iosa Ghini to celebrate Roche Bobois's 40th anniversary 
The Ping Pong Collection by Paola Navone
The Comète sofa by Vladimir Kagan
The Rive Droite Collection by Christophe Delcourt, who subsequently created the Legend bookcase
The Speed Up range by Sacha Lakic
Cute Cut coffee tables by Cédric Ragot
The Furtif Collection by Daniel Rode
The Assemblage Collection by Stéphan Lebrun
The Ora Ito Collection of furniture

A number of these collections were presented at the Mobi Boom exhibition at the Musée des Arts Décoratifs of Paris.
Fashion designers, too, have added their mark to Roche Bobois: Kenzo, Missoni, Ungaro, Jean Paul Gaultier and Sonia Rykiel and Christian Lacroix.

Notes and references 
The information on this page is partially translated from the equivalent page in French

External links

French companies established in 1950
Furniture companies of France
Retail companies established in 1950
Retail companies of France
Companies listed on Euronext Paris
Companies based in Paris